C/2020 F8 (SWAN), or Comet SWAN, is an Oort cloud comet that was discovered in images taken by the Solar Wind Anisotropies (SWAN) camera on March 25, 2020, aboard the Solar Heliospheric Observer (SOHO) spacecraft. In the glare of twilight, Comet SWAN is difficult to find with 50mm binoculars even though it is still near the theoretical range of naked eye visibility. The comet has dimmed since May 3. As of perihelion, the comet is very diffuse, does not have a visible nucleus and is not a comet that will be noticed by inexperienced observers. It is likely that the comet disintegrated.

Observing 
On April 28, 2020 it had an apparent magnitude of 7 and was too diffuse to be visible to the naked eye even from a dark site. The comet was also hidden by the glare of twilight, zodiacal light and atmospheric extinction. It was originally best seen from the Southern Hemisphere. It was expected to possibly reach 3rd magnitude in May, but instead hovered closer to magnitude 6. In either case it was near the glare of twilight, which made it appear significantly fainter. On May 2, the comet had reached a magnitude of 4.7 and had been detected with naked eye, the tail had a visual length of one degree and could be traced photographically for 6-8 degrees. After that the comet faded, probably as the nucleus of the comet fragmented. It passed through the celestial equator on 7 May, then it headed northward and it was near the 2nd magnitude star Algol on 20 May. It passed its perihelion on May 27, 2020.

Orbit 

With a 40-day observation arc it was possible to determine that it came from the Oort cloud on a Hyperbolic trajectory and that the outbound orbit will last ~11,000 years.

On May 27, 2020 the comet came to perihelion  from the Sun.

Gallery

References

External links 
 C/2020 F8 (SWAN) – Seiichi Yoshida
 C/2020 F8 (SWAN) – JPL
 C/2020 F8 Swan on June 1 (without a defined nucleus) – Michael Jäger
 C/2020 F8 (SWAN) – AiM-Project

Astronomical objects discovered in 2020
Comets in 2020
Destroyed comets
Oort cloud